J. D. "David" Carpenter is a poet and novelist who lives in Prince Edward County, Ontario.

Carpenter was born in 1948 and grew up in Toronto, Ontario, Canada. He attended York University, where he received a Bachelor of Arts degree in 1971, and Queen's University, where he received a Bachelor of Education degree in 1972. He first worked as a journalist for Daily Racing Form and as a freelance writer.  He then taught high school English for 25 years.

Carpenter began his writing career as a poet, publishing four books of poetry between 1976 and 1994: Nightfall, Ferryland Head (Missing Link Press, 1976); Swimming at Twelve Mile (Penumbra Press, 1979); Lakeview (Black Moss Press, 1990); and Compassionate Travel (Black Moss Press, 1994). He then turned to crime fiction during the 1990s and has published five novels: The Devil in Me (McClelland & Stewart, 2001); Bright's Kill (Dundurn Press, 2005); 74 Miles Away (Dundurn Press, 2007); Twelve Trees (Dundurn Press, 2008); and The County Murders (Cressy Lakeside Books, 2016).  He is currently working on a sequel, The Lake Pirates, and planning additional works. His first novel appeared on the Globe and Mail's bestseller list and was nominated for an Arthur Ellis Award; his subsequent novels have also received critical acclaim,.

He is also locally known for writing and performing jazz poetry with musical accompaniment.

References

1948 births
Living people
20th-century Canadian poets
Canadian male poets
Canadian male novelists
Writers from Toronto
20th-century Canadian male writers
20th-century Canadian novelists